Mario Casas Sierra (born 12 June 1986) is a Spanish actor. He rose to fame in Spain with the television series Los hombres de Paco (2007-2010), and later in the film Three Steps Above Heaven (2010).

Early life and education
Casas was born in A Coruña, moving to Barcelona at the age of 4. He eventually decided to become an actor after he enrolled at the Cristina Rota School of Dramatic Arts

Acting career

2005–2010: Early work and breakthrough 
Casas began appearing in soap operas from 2005 at age 19, before earning minor roles in several Spanish films. Mario Casas began his acting career with episode appearances in television series Obsesión (English: Obsession), Motivos personales (Personal Motives) and Mujeres (Women). He came to domestic media attention with his film debut in the 2006 film El camino de los ingleses (Summer Rain), directed by Antonio Banderas.

That same year he joined the cast of LaSexta series SMS. Casas then reached international audience as Aitor Carrasco in the Antena 3 series Los hombres de Paco (Paco's Men), which he starred from 2007 to 2010.

In 2009, Casas appeared in two hit films, Fuga de cerebros (Brain Drain) opposite Amaia Salamanca, and Mentiras y Gordas (Sex, Party and Lies) with his best friend Yon González, Ana Maria Polvorosa, Ana de Armas and Hugo Silva. Both managed to lead the box office over the weekend of its release. In 2010, Casas starred in Carne de neón (Neon Flesh) directed by Paco Cabezas. Later that year in December 2010, he starred in Tres metros sobre el cielo (Three Steps Above Heaven) opposite María Valverde. It was eventually the highest-grossing Spanish film of the year. A sequel Tengo ganas de ti (I Want You), which stars Casas, Valverde and Clara Lago, premiered in 2012. He also appeared in Miedo (2010), directed by Jaume Balagueró.

2011–present: Career expansion and further acclaim 

Since 2011, Casas has starred the Antena 3 series El barco (The Boat), he also starred in Tengo ganas de ti (I Want You), premiered in 2012.

During the late 2013 and early 2014, he went to Colombia and Chile for his second film project in English called Los 33 (The 33) with Antonio Banderas and Juliette Binoche, a story based on the Chilean mining accident that occurred in 2010. In 2015, Mario also starred in two other films: the new Álex de la Iglesia comedy film My Great Night, and also in the romantic drama film Palmeras en la Nieve (Palm Trees in the Snow), where he reunited with the director of the films Tres metros sobre el cielo (Three Steps Above Heaven) and Tengo ganas de ti (I Want You), Fernando Gonzalez Molina. In 2016, he performed in a thriller movie called "The Invisible Guest" which was a commercial success, although the film had opened to mixed critical responses. The film grossed US$3.9 million in Spain and CN¥172.4 million in China. On Rotten Tomatoes the film had an approval rating of 67% based on reviews from 8 critics.

In 2018, Casas starred in El fotógrafo de Mauthausen which tells the story of Francisco Boix, a Spanish Republican photographer who was sent to the Mauthausen-Gusen concentration camp complex during World War II. Casas lost around 12 kilograms (26 pounds) to play Boix during his imprisonment.

In October 2022, Casas began to shoot his debut as a feature film director, Mi soledad tiene alas, written alongside Deborah François and starring his brother Óscar.

Filmography

Film

Television

Accolades

References

External links 

 
 

1986 births
Male actors from Galicia (Spain)
Living people
Spanish male film actors
Spanish male models
Spanish male television actors
People from A Coruña
Male actors from Barcelona
21st-century Spanish male actors
Best Actor Goya Award winners